Kutan may refer to:

Places in Iran 
 Kutan-e Olya, a village in Takab County, West Azerbaijan Province
 Kutan-e Sofla, a village in Bijar County, Kurdistan Province

People 
 Köten (13th century), Cuman military leader
 Recai Kutan (born 1930), Turkish politician

See also 
 Ibn Ishaq, also known as ibn Kutan (8th century), Arab historian
 Cutan (disambiguation)
 Qutan (disambiguation)
 Kutang (disambiguation)